The Khatanga is a river in Krasnoyarsk Krai in Russia. The river is navigable. The river port of Khatanga is located on the river.

Course
It begins at the confluence of the rivers Kotuy and Kheta. It flows into the Khatanga Gulf of the Laptev Sea, forming an estuary.

The Khatanga freezes up in late September–early October and breaks up in early June. Its main tributaries are the Nizhnyaya, Bludnaya, Popigay, Novaya, and Malaya Balakhnya.

Fauna
The Khatanga teems with different kinds of fish, including ryapushka, omul, muksun, white salmon, taimen, loach, among others.

History

Russian fur traders first reached the Khatanga about 1611.

See also
 List of largest unfragmented rivers
 Katanga, name for the upper course of the river Podkamennaya Tunguska

References

External links

Rivers of Krasnoyarsk Krai
Drainage basins of the Laptev Sea
North Siberian Lowland